Takram (also Romanized as Tekerem; also known as Āb-e-Takrīm and Āb-i-Takrim) is a village in Jirdeh Rural District, in the Central District of Shaft County, Gilan Province, Iran. At the 2006 census, its population was 582, in 154 families.

References 

Populated places in Shaft County